The Benjamin Beard House is a historic house in Reading, Massachusetts. Built in the early 1850s, it is a well-preserved example of a distinctive local variant of Greek Revival architecture. It was listed on the National Register of Historic Places in 1984.

Description and history
The Benjamin Beard House stands south of downtown Reading, at the southwest corner of Ash Street and Avon Street. The house is a -story wood-frame structure, with a side-gable roof, single off-center interior chimney, and clapboarded exterior. It is laid out in what was a fairly common local variant, with the long spine of the house parallel to the street, and set on a slightly raised mound. There are pilasters on the corners, and the front entry has a somewhat tall Federal style high entablature, with sidelight windows and plain side molding supporting a corniced entablature. A single-story ell extends to the rear of the main block.

The house was probably built in the early 1850s. Benjamin Beard, its first owner, was the town's first jeweler, opening a store in 1847 after having previously worked for a local clock- and watchmaker. Beard's son William also continued the profession.

See also
National Register of Historic Places listings in Reading, Massachusetts
National Register of Historic Places listings in Middlesex County, Massachusetts

References

Houses on the National Register of Historic Places in Reading, Massachusetts
Houses in Reading, Massachusetts
1854 establishments in Massachusetts
Greek Revival houses in Massachusetts